Hengaran (also Romanized as Hengarān) is a village in Qaleh Zari Rural District, Jolgeh-e Mazhan District, Khusf County, South Khorasan Province, Iran. At the 2006 census, its population was 39, in 11 families.

References 

Populated places in Khusf County